Full Blown Possession is the fifth and last full-length album by Memphis indie rock band The Grifters, released in 1997.

Production
The band recorded five of the album's songs at Sun Studios, in Memphis, Tennessee. The album was produced by Doug Easley, Davis McCain, John Neil Martin and the band.

Critical reception
The Memphis Flyer wrote that "the record includes most of the hallmarks of the band's sound -- like driving, chuka-chuka bass lines, tantalizing leads lurking just beneath the surface, and their distinctive staggering tempos." The Washington Post wrote: "Although not as broken-down and freaked-out as the band's apparent model, Alex Chilton's Like Flies on Sherbert, the album is ramshackle and atmospheric just as often as it's hot-blooded and direct." The Chicago Reader wrote that "the Grifters place their bets solidly on jagged pop hooks, off-kilter blues structures, and keen dynamics--much like the Rolling Stones of yore." 

The Chicago Tribune called the album "excellent" and "a no-nonsense uppercut of venomous Memphis R&B and darkly melodic rock that'll leave you drinking through a straw." The Austin Chronicle wrote that the band sticks "to what they know: a world that's slightly spooky and more than a bit seedy, where rough-edged riffs weave together with a disconcerting delicacy and singer Scott Taylor's eloquent trash talk." CMJ New Music Monthly thought that "other rock bands may play the blues, but the Grifters really mess with it."

Track listing

The song "Spaced Out" was re-recorded by Dave Shouse in 1999 for his solo project Those Bastard Souls.

Album credits

Grifters
 Stan Gallimore – Drums
 Tripp Lamkins – Bass, Guitar, Moog, Electric Piano
 Dave Shouse – Vocals, Guitar, Piano, Clavinet, Harmonica
 Scott Taylor – Vocals, Guitar, Organ, Mellotron

Additional musicians
 Doug Easley – Weird Sound on “Centuries”
 John Stivers (Impala) – Guitar on “You Be the Stranger”
 Skronkadelic Rhythm Factory – on “Contact Me Now”

Additional credits
 Photography by Dan Ball
 Chair Painting by Tobin Sprout
 Full Blown Possession cover drawing by Tripp Lamkins
 Layout mostly by J. Saaed
 Recorded by Doug Easley, Davis McCain and Stuart Sikes at Easley's, Memphis, Tennessee (2,4,5,7,9,10,12)
 Recorded by John Neil Martin and Jenny Hall at Sun Studios Beale Street, Memphis, Tennessee (1,3,6,8,11)
 Mixed by Nick Sansano
 Mastered by John Golden at John Gold Mastering, Newbury Park, California

References

Grifters (band) albums
1997 albums
Sub Pop albums
Albums recorded at Sun Studio